Sport Vereniging Caravan  is an association football club from Livorno, Suriname. The club currently compete in the SVB Eerste Klasse, the 2nd tier of football in Suriname.

Achievements
Lidbondentoernooi
Winners: 2012

References

External links
 Caravan at SVB.sr

Caravan
Caravan